Heber Austin Ladner (October 4, 1902 - June 14, 1989) was the Secretary of State of Mississippi from 1948 to 1980. He was a Democrat.

Early life and education 
Heber Austin Ladner was born on October 4, 1902, in Lumberton, Mississippi. His parents were Webster L. Ladner and Valena Beall Ladner. He graduated from Millsaps College with a BS degree in 1929.

Career 
Ladner started his political career as a member of the Mississippi House of Representatives in 1936. In the House, he represented Pearl River County from 1936 to 1940. From 1940 to 1942, he was the Secretary of the Mississippi Budget Commission. He was the Clerk of the Mississippi House of Representatives from 1942 to 1948.

In 1948, Ladner became the Secretary of State of Mississippi. In 1968, he administrated the oath to the first black state legislator elected in 74 years. However, he was a defendant in suits brought by black people for school desegregation and proportional representation in county election boards. He chaired the  Mississippi Bicentennial Celebration Commission. He left office in January 1980, holding the record for longest-serving Secretary of State of Mississippi. Declining to seek an additional term, he reasoned, "I would be in office in my 80s. I have not had really any rest for several decades. I think I've earned some."

Ladner died of heart disease on June 14, 1989, at the Mississippi Baptist Medical Center in Jackson, Mississippi.

References

Works cited 
 

1902 births
1989 deaths
People from Lumberton, Mississippi
Secretaries of State of Mississippi
Democratic Party members of the Mississippi House of Representatives
Millsaps College alumni